The Colombian small-eared shrew (Cryptotis colombiana) is a species of mammal in the family Soricidae. It is found in montane forest and cultivated areas. It resembles C. brachyonyx.

References

Cryptotis
Mammals of Colombia
Mammals of the Andes
Endemic fauna of Colombia
Mammals described in 1993